Generation Iron 2 is a 2017 documentary film and sequel to Generation Iron.  The film follows the next generation of bodybuilders as the industry opens up to viral internet stars as well as younger bodybuilders pushing the limits of how massive the human physique can become.  The film features Kai Greene, Calum Von Moger, Rich Piana, and Flex Wheeler, among other athletes.

Generation Iron 2 was released in limited theatrical, DVD, and Video On Demand on May 12, 2017.

Cast 

 Kai Greene
 Calum von Moger
 Rich Piana
 Iris Kyle
 Flex Wheeler
 Mamdouh Elssbiay
 Hidetada Yamagishi
 Brandon Curry
 Dana Linn Bailey

Synopsis 

Generation Iron 2 is the sequel to the 2013 documentary film Generation Iron. The follow up film, directed by Vlad Yudin, follows the top five bodybuilding and fitness mega-stars on the journey to build the ultimate physique. Exploring the world of social media and internet, the film depicts how the rules have changed as to what makes a successful "mass monster" bodybuilder. A new generation, new bodybuilders, new world, and new people carve their own path to physique perfection.

References

External links
 

2017 films
Documentary films about bodybuilding
American sequel films
American sports documentary films
2010s English-language films
2010s American films